Huang Zhiquan may refer to:

Huang Zhiquan (politician, born 1908) (黃穉荃), Chinese politician and member of the Legislative Yuan
Huang Zhiquan (politician, born 1942) (黄智权), Chinese politician and Governor of Jiangxi

See also
Huang Zhiqian, Chinese aircraft designer